Islam in Ukraine is a minority religious affiliation with Muslims representing around 0.9% of the total population as of 2016. The religion has a long history in Ukraine dating back to Berke Khan of the Ulug Ulus (Golden Horde) in the 13th century and the establishment of the Crimean Khanate in the 15th century.

History 

Crimean Muslims were subjected to mass deportation in 1944 when Joseph Stalin accused them of collaborating with Nazi Germany. More than 200,000 Crimean Tatars were deported to Central Asia, primarily the Uzbek SSR. It is estimated that more than 100,000 deportees died of starvation or disease due to the deportation.

Ukrainian Muslims today

Sunni Islam of the Hanafi school is the largest non-Christian religion in Ukraine, and the majority of Ukrainian Muslims are Crimean Tatars. Other Turkic peoples indigenous to Ukraine, predominantly found in South and south-east Ukraine, practice other forms of Islam. These include Volga Tatars, Azeris, North Caucasian ethnic groups and 
Uzbeks.

There is also a smaller community of Turks in Ukraine, although due to language convergence and cultural assimilation they are often included as part of the Crimean Tatar minority. In 2012 an estimated 1,500,000 of Muslims lived in Ukraine.

Population 
Muslims in Ukraine have 445 communities, 433 ministers, and 160 mosques, with many more mosques currently being built.

Estimates of the Ukrainian Muslim population vary. Muslims make up only approximately 0.9% of the Ukrainian population, but as much as 12% in Crimea. According to the 2000 census Ukraine was home to 248,193 Crimean Tatars, 73,304 Volga Tatars, 45,176 Azeris, 12,353 Uzbeks, 8,844 Turks, 6,575 Arabs and 5,526 Kazakhs.

The 2012 Freedom Report estimated a Muslim population of 500,000 in Ukraine, including 300,000 Crimean Tatars. A 2011 Pew Forum study estimated a Ukrainian Muslim population of 393,000, but the Clerical Board of Ukraine's Muslims claimed there were two million Muslims in Ukraine as of 2009. According to Said Ismagilov, the mufti of Ummah, in February 2016 one million Muslims lived in Ukraine.

Due to the 2014 Russian annexation of Crimea and the War in Donbass, which is fought near Donetsk and Luhansk, 750,000 Muslims (including half-million Crimean Tatars) are living in territory no longer controlled by Ukraine. (According to figures as stated by Sheikh Ahmad Tamim, the mufti of Religious Administration of Muslims of Ukraine "DUMU".)

Gallery

See also
 Ochakiv
 Mustafa Dzhemilev

References

External links

 http://risu.org.ua/en/index (Religious information service of Ukraine)
 http://www.islam.in.ua (News & publicist site about Islam & Muslim in Ukraine)
 https://web.archive.org/web/20090131210406/http://islamyat.org/ Clerical Board of Ukraine's Muslims website 
 Crimean Tatar Internet Resources 
 Crimean Tatars Short History
 Ukrainian translations of the Meanings of the Glorious Qur'an: Problems and Prospects. An article by Mykhaylo Yakubovych
 Yakubovych, Mykhaylo 'Islam and Muslims in Contemporary Ukraine: Common Backgrounds, Different Images', Religion, State and Society, September 2010, 38:3, 291 - 304

 
Religion in Ukraine
History of religion in Ukraine
Ukraine